Helal-e Ahmar Metro Station is a station in Tehran Metro Line 7. It is located along Qazvin Street in Southwestern Central Tehran.

References

Tehran Metro stations
Railway stations opened in 2017